Frances Marie Corner,  ( Agnew; born 25 February 1959) is a British art and design historian and academic, specialising in fashion. Since 2019, she has been Warden of Goldsmiths, University of London. On 23 November 2020, staff announced a vote of no confidence in Prof. Corner, the no-confidence motion being backed by 87% of those who voted. In June 2022, her use of expenses at Goldsmiths was brought into question when it was revealed that she had spent nearly £20k of College money on taxis over 2 years.

She was previously head of the London College of Fashion from 2005 to 2019, and a pro vice-chancellor of University of the Arts London from 2013 to 2019. She taught at the University of Gloucestershire and London Metropolitan University, before joining the London College of Fashion.

Education
Corner received her BA at Central Saint Martins and her MA from the Chelsea School of Art. She went to Oxford University for her DPhil.

Personal life
In 1980, the then Frances Marie Agnew married Anthony Peter Corner. Together, they have one son.

In the 2009 Queen's Birthday Honours, Corner was appointed an Officer of the Order of the British Empire (OBE) for services to the fashion industry.

Books

References

External links
 Official website

1959 births
Living people
British art historians
Women art historians
Academics of the University of Gloucestershire
Academics of London Metropolitan University
Academics of the London College of Fashion
Academics of Goldsmiths, University of London
Officers of the Order of the British Empire